John J. "Butch" Lenzini Jr. (January 10, 1947 - November 13, 1996) was an American horse trainer in Thoroughbred flat racing best known for winning the 1982 Preakness Stakes, the second leg of the U.S. Triple Crown series.

Nicknamed "Butch," he was born in Weymouth, Massachusetts but raised in Rhode Island. His father, John Sr., was a trainer who worked at racetracks on the East Coast of the United States. Following in his father's footsteps, Lenzini Jr. earned his first win as a professional trainer in 1969 at Narragansett Park in Pawtucket, Rhode Island.

After relocating to race at tracks in Maryland, he was hired by Boston Bruins goalie Gerry Cheevers to trainer his horses, the best of which would be Grade 1 winner Royal Ski.

Lenzini's association with Baltimore builder Nathan Scherr brought him his greatest success in racing in 1982. As the trainer for Scherr's colt, Aloma's Ruler, in January he won the Bahamas Stakes at Hialeah Park Race Track, the May 8th Withers Stakes at Aqueduct Racetrack, then the biggest win of his career, the Preakness Stakes at Pimlico Race Course. In July,  Aloma's Ruler won the Jersey Derby at Monmouth Park but came out of a second-place finish in the August 21st Travers Stakes at Saratoga Race Course with an ankle injury that ended his career.

In 1984, John Lenzini Jr. moved his training operation to New York where he was the trainer for Brian J. Hurst and partners good runner, Eternal Prince. The colt won the 1985 Gotham Stakes and Wood Memorial Stakes and was third in the Preakness Stakes.

John Lenzini Jr. died at age forty-nine on November 13, 1996, at his home at Woodbury, Long Island, New York.

References

 November 15, 1996 New york Times obituary for John J. Lenzini Jr.
 May 12, 1982 Sports Illustrated article on John Lenzini Jr. and the Preakness Stakes

1947 births
1996 deaths
American horse trainers
Sportspeople from Weymouth, Massachusetts
People from Woodbury, Nassau County, New York